Pavel Zářecký (born 21 April 1940) is a Czech politician and lawyer. He's the former Chairman of the Legislative Council.

Early life 
Zářecký is a graduate of the Charles University in Prague. He's married and has one daughter. In 1966-1969 he was a member of the Communist Party of Czechoslovakia.

Chairman of the Legislative Council 
He is very close to the Czech Social Democratic Party and served in the cabinet of then-Prime Minister Jiří Paroubek in the same position he had held since 30 November 2009.

References

1940 births
Living people
Charles University alumni
20th-century Czech lawyers
Government ministers of the Czech Republic
People from Mělník
Communist Party of Czechoslovakia politicians
Czech Social Democratic Party Government ministers
Czechoslovak lawyers